Henry George 'Harry' Saunders (21 May 1898 – 9 December 1930) was an Australian rules footballer who played for Collingwood and coached Footscray in the Victorian Football League (VFL).

Family
The son of Henry Saunders (1859-1921), and Hannah Saunders (1863-1941), née Guiney, Henry George Saunders was born at Portland, Victoria on 21 May 1898.

He married Millicent May "Mollie" Allen (1900-1963), later Mrs. Walter William James Crawford, in 1922.

Education
He attended Christian Brothers' College, East Melbourne.

Football

Collingwood (VFL)
Saunders was recruited locally to Collingwood and went on to play 11 seasons with the club as a defender, mostly at full-back. He was a member of Collingwood premiership teams in 1917 and 1919 as well as playing in three losing Grand Finals. Saunders also represented the VFL at interstate football on three occasions.

1922
In 1922, following a game where he had knocked out Carlton's Alex Duncan, the VFL Tribunal suspended him for six matches. He was also charged by the police, found guilty in court, and fined £5, in default a month's imprisonment.

1926
After playing the opening two rounds of the 1926 season Saunders retired from playing.

Footscray (VFL)
He was cleared to Footscray in mid-season 1926, and coached them, as non-playing coach, in 10 games for three wins. South Melbourne's Paddy Scanlan was appointed as Footscray's captain-coach at the beginning of the 1927 season.

Death
Saunders died on 9 December 1930 following an operation for pancreatitis, aged 32.

References

External links

 
 Harry Saunders's coaching statistics, from AFL Tables.
 
 Harry Saunders' profile at Collingwood Forever

1898 births
1930 deaths
Australian rules footballers from Victoria (Australia)
Collingwood Football Club players
Collingwood Football Club Premiership players
Western Bulldogs coaches
Deaths from pancreatitis
Two-time VFL/AFL Premiership players